Ussingite is a silicate mineral with formula Na2AlSi3O8(OH).

It was named for Niels Viggo Ussing (1864–1911), Copenhagen, Denmark.

References 

Phyllosilicates
Triclinic minerals
Minerals in space group 2